The Merritt Parkway (also known locally as "The Merritt") is a limited-access parkway in Fairfield County, Connecticut, with a small section at the northern end in New Haven County. Designed for Connecticut's Gold Coast, the parkway is known for its scenic layout, its uniquely styled signage, and the architecturally elaborate overpasses along the route. As one of the first, oldest parkways in the United States, it is designated as a National Scenic Byway and is also listed in the National Register of Historic Places. Signed as part of Route 15, it runs from the New York state line in Greenwich, where it serves as the continuation of the Hutchinson River Parkway, to Exit 54 in Milford, where the Wilbur Cross Parkway begins. Facing bitter opposition, the project took six years to build in three different sections, with the Connecticut Department of Transportation constantly requiring additional funding due to the area's high property value. The parkway was named for U.S. Congressman Schuyler Merritt. In 2010, the National Trust for Historic Preservation called the Merritt Parkway one of "America's 11 Most Endangered Historic Places".

Route description

The Merritt is one of a handful of United States highways listed in the National Register of Historic Places. It is acknowledged for the beauty of the forest through which it passes, as well as the architectural design of its overpasses; at the time of its construction, each bridge was decorated in a unique fashion so that no two bridges on the parkway looked alike.  Newer overpasses used at exit 39 (US 7), though, did not maintain this tradition, and as a result, exit 39 on the parkway is now spanned by several ordinary modern bridges constructed using undecorated concrete-on-steel I-beams.

The parkway has two lanes in each direction. Due to its age, it was originally constructed without the merge lanes, long on-ramps, and long off-ramps that are found on modern limited-access highways. Some entrances have perilously short and/or sharp ramps; some entrances even have stop signs, with no merge lane whatsoever; this leads to some dangerous entrances onto the highway. Most have since been modernized, with the interchange of Route 111 in Trumbull featuring Connecticut's first single-point urban interchange (SPUI). The speed limit on the parkway ranges from 50 to 55 mph (80 to 90 km/h). An exit 43 was planned in the middle of this stretch, but was never built because it would have connected to a northerly extension of the Sherwood Island Connector, which itself was never built to that point.

Under extenuating circumstances, however, ConnDOT may issue permits for oversized vehicles to use the parkway.

History

The Merritt Parkway is one of the oldest scenic parkways in the United States. The portion from Greenwich to Norwalk was opened on June 29, 1938. The section from Norwalk to Trumbull was completed in November 1939, and in 1940, it was finished to the Housatonic River in Stratford. The parkway was named for U.S. Congressman Schuyler Merritt, who was instrumental in enacting legislation allowing the parkway to be built. The Merritt Parkway is the first leg of what later became  modern Route 15. It was conceived as a way to alleviate congestion on the Boston Post Road (U.S. Route 1) in Fairfield County.

After the parkway fully opened in 1940, travelers not uncommonly stopped to picnic along the side of the road. The Merritt Parkway Advisory Commission (later the Merritt Parkway Advisory Committee) decided to ban horses and buggies, bicycles, pedestrians, billboards, and U-turns, while a system of horse trails along the parkway was developed, but later abandoned.

To ease objections from county residents, who feared an influx of New Yorkers on their roads, in their towns, on their beaches, and through their forests, highway planners called on engineers, landscape architects, and architects to create a safe and aesthetically pleasing limited-access highway, one with exit and entrance ramps, but no intersections, that would not spoil the countryside.

The bridges played a prominent role in the design. Architect George L. Dunkelberger designed them all. They reflected the popularity of the Art Deco style, with touches of neoclassical and modern design. Some of these bridges were constructed by the Works Progress Administration.

Tolls were collected on the parkway at one toll plaza in Greenwich from June 21, 1939, until June 27, 1988. Two additional tolls were also located on the Wilbur Cross Parkway, in Milford and Wallingford. One of the parkway's former toll plazas is now preserved in Stratford's Boothe Memorial Park near Exit 53, complete with still-flashing lights over each toll lane.

In April 2001, a complete reissuance of the parkway's signs was carried out, instituting a uniform white-on-green color scheme, and a sawtooth border.

Services
Six rest areas/service plazas, featuring parking lots, gas stations, and convenience stores, were also built along the Merritt Parkway so that drivers would not have to exit to refuel. Pairs of plazas are located opposite each other on either side of the parkway in Fairfield (near exit 46), New Canaan (near exit 37), and Greenwich (just beyond the CT-NY state line). The northbound-side plaza in Greenwich also houses a Connecticut welcome center. The plazas were originally constructed during the parkway's days as a tolled highway, but remained even after the tolls were removed in 1988, making the parkway one of only a few toll-free highways with service plazas along its length. Between 2011 and 2015, all six of the service plazas (along with the four located further north along the Wilbur Cross Parkway) were completely renovated. The renovations preserved the original brick-and-stone façade of the buildings, but completely redesigned and modernized the interiors. The plazas now include more modern gas pumps, Alltown convenience stores, and a Dunkin' Donuts shop at each location; three of the Merritt's six plazas also include a Subway shop. Prior to the renovations, no fast-food service had previously been available at the plazas. The renovation project was completed during the summer of 2015, when the New Canaan plazas were reopened.

In 2013, electric-vehicle (EV) charging stations for Tesla automobiles were added to both the northbound and southbound Greenwich service plazas, with four Superchargers installed in each direction.  In addition, charging for CHAdeMO-equipped EVs was added to the northbound Greenwich service plaza. The parking/charging stalls are some of the first in the U.S. to be designated "shared use" - EVs may use the stall for up to 45 minutes to charge, or internal-combustion engine  vehicles may park for up to 15 minutes.

Safety

One of the Merritt's aesthetic features is also a potential danger to its drivers.  Trees that line either side of the parkway, and often in the center median, grow branches that cover the roadway, and occasionally fall during severe weather, or with natural aging. Stretches of the parkway also lack guardrails on the right shoulders, creating a risk of tree-impact accidents if cars veer off the pavement.

In 2007, after complaints were voiced about the danger of the trees along the parkway, state officials announced they would trim and eliminate some of them more aggressively. A large, seemingly healthy tree fell on a car near exit 42 in Westport in June 2007, killing a couple from Pelham, New York. On June 23, 2011, a driver was killed in Stamford when a tree fell onto his car.

A state study of fatalities on Connecticut highways showed that from 1985 to 1992, about 10 people died every three years in tree-related accidents, although no other state roadway averaged more than one in three years.

Trees that had been scheduled to be cut down in five to 10 years would be removed sooner.

Following the 2007 and 2011 incidents, the state became more aggressive in closing the parkway in times of severe weather. The parkway was closed during Tropical Storm Irene  and the Halloween nor'easter in 2011, and Hurricane Sandy in 2012. With each of those storms, many trees and limbs fell across the parkway. After Sandy, the state began a large effort to remove unhealthy trees, and in the process created much wider clearances between the roadside and forest.

The Merritt Parkway Advisory Committee meets quarterly.

Future

ConnDOT is currently reviewing plans and holding community meetings over a redesign of the Merritt's interchange with U.S. Route 7 (US 7) and Main Avenue in Norwalk, exits 39 and 40. The US 7 freeway was extended north to Wilton from its previous terminus in the northern part of Norwalk in 1992, passing the Merritt along the way. Due to a lack of funds, a full interchange was not built between the Merritt and US 7, which led to the lack of the important southbound Merritt to southbound US 7 connection. Not long after, ConnDOT and the federal government drew up plans for a three-level interchange that provided all connections between Main Avenue, the Merritt, and US 7. Work was supposed to begin on the Main Avenue portion in 2005 and on the US 7 and Merritt portion in 2007, but local activists filed and won a lawsuit in 2006 against ConnDOT and the federal government, alleging that not only was the proposal too expensive, but also the plans were rushed and did not take into account the beauty and historical significance of the parkway. Similar lawsuits were brought on earlier during the construction of the interchanges at Route 8 and Route 25, but both failed. The lawsuit specifically mentioned the flyover ramps between the Merritt and US 7 as a significant issue. ConnDOT and the federal government were forced to redesign their plans, with hopes of construction starting in 2009. Plans soon fell apart, and ConnDOT was forced to temporarily drop the issue. Community outreach started back up in 2017, and ConnDOT is actively drawing up plans as of May 2019 with hopes of starting construction sometime between 2021 and 2024.

Exit list
Like most highways in Connecticut, exits are numbered sequentially, not mile-based, though the state is gradually transitioning to milepost-based exit numbers. Exit numbers on the Merritt Parkway continue from the original sequential exits of the Hutchinson River Parkway, which ended at 27; since 2021, the Hutchinson River Parkway has used a mileage-based system ending at 19A. King Street (NY 120A), which travels along the state border, is served by exit 27 on the Merritt Parkway and exit 19A on the Hutchinson River Parkway. Prior to 2021, because additional interchanges had been added on the New York side, exit 19A on the Hutchinson River Parkway was numbered as exit 30.

In popular culture
 The Willem de Kooning oil-on-canvas painting Merritt Parkway (1959) is owned by the Detroit Institute of Arts.
 Lisa Seidenberg, a filmmaker from Westport, produced a documentary film, The Road Taken...The Merritt Parkway (2008).
 The Merritt Parkway is mentioned in J. D. Salinger's short story, "Uncle Wiggily in Connecticut", published in The New Yorker in 1948 and included in his 1953 book, Nine Stories.
 The introduction sequence to the sitcom Who's the Boss briefly featured the parkway at an exit near Westport.

Images

See also

 Merritt Parkway Bridges
 National Register of Historic Places listings in Fairfield County, Connecticut
 Connecticut Route 15

References

Further reading

 
 

All of the following are filed under Fairfield County, CT:

External links

 Merritt Parkway Exhibit (Connecticut State Library)
 Merritt Parkway Conservancy
 Photos of the parkway at byways.org
 Photos of and information about the parkway at nycroads.com
 Connecticut Dept of Transportation rules about what vehicles are allowed on the parkway
 CT 15 (Greater New York Roads)

National Scenic Byways
Roads on the National Register of Historic Places in Connecticut
State highways in Connecticut
Transportation in Fairfield County, Connecticut
Parkways in the United States
Former toll roads in Connecticut
Works Progress Administration in Connecticut
National Register of Historic Places in Fairfield County, Connecticut
Historic American Engineering Record in Connecticut
Parks on the National Register of Historic Places in Connecticut
1938 establishments in Connecticut
Transportation in New Haven County, Connecticut